The Xinjiang even-fingered gecko or Przewalski's pygmy gecko (Alsophylax przewalskii) is a species of lizard in the family Gekkonidae. The species is endemic to Asia.

Etymology
The specific name, przewalskii, is in honor of Russian explorer and naturalist Nikolai Mikhailovitch Prjevalsky.

Geographic range
According to IUCN, A. przewalskii is endemic to western China (Xinjiang and Gansu provinces).The Reptile Database also mentions western Turkestan, overlapping with multiple modern-day jurisdictions.

Habitat

Reproduction
A. przewalskii is oviparous.

References

Further reading
Rösler H (2000). "Kommentierte Liste der rezent, subrezent und fossil bekannten Geckotaxa (Reptilia: Gekkonomorpha)". Gekkota 2: 28–153. (Alsophylax przewalskii, p. 59). (in German).
Strauch A (1887). "Bemerkungen über die Geckoniden-Sammlung im zoologischen Museum der kaiserlichen Akademie der Wissenschaften zu St. Petersburg ". Mémoires de l'Académie Impériale des Sciences de St.-Pétersbourg, Septième Série [Seventh Series] 35 (2): 1-72 + ii (index) + one unnumbered plate. (Alsophylax przewalskii, new species, pp. 55–57). (in German).
Zhao E, Adler K (1993). Herpetology of China. Oxford, Ohio: Society for the Study of Amphibians and Reptiles (SSAR). 522 pp. . (Alsophylax przewalskii, pp. 178, 303 + color photograph on p. 21).

Alsophylax
Reptiles of China
Endemic fauna of China
Reptiles described in 1887
Taxa named by Alexander Strauch